Talking Rock may refer to:

Talking Rock, Georgia, a town in Pickens County
Talking Rock Creek, a stream in Georgia
Talking Rock Ranch, a master planned community in Prescott, Arizona
Talking Rocks Cavern, in Missouri